The following is a list of Michigan State Historic Sites in Huron County, Michigan. Sites marked with a dagger (†) are also listed on the National Register of Historic Places in Huron County, Michigan.


Current listings

See also
 National Register of Historic Places listings in Huron County, Michigan

Sources
 Historic Sites Online – Huron County. Michigan State Housing Developmental Authority. Accessed January 23, 2011.

References

Huron County
State Historic Sites
Tourist attractions in Huron County, Michigan